"Good Rocking Tonight" is a jump blues song originally released in 1947 by its writer, Roy Brown and was covered by many recording artists (sometimes as Good Rockin' Tonight). The song includes the memorable refrain, "Well I heard the news, there's good rocking tonight!" The song anticipated elements of rock and roll music. 

Some reviewers state that Brown's version, or Wynonie Harris' (depending on the source), is one of the contenders for the title of "first rock'n'roll record". The label of the 45 RPM record by Brown included the words "Rocking blues".

In 2022, Brown's recording was inducted into the Blues Hall of Fame in the 'Classics of Blues Recording – Singles' category.

Original song
Brown had first offered his song to Wynonie Harris, who turned it down. He then approached Cecil Gant later that night, but after hearing Brown sing, Gant made a 2:30 AM phone call to Jules Braun, the president of DeLuxe Records. After Brown sang his song over the phone, Braun asked Brown to sing it a second time. He then told Gant, "Give him fifty dollars and don't let him out of your sight." According to the Paul McCartney Project, "Harris’s version was even more energetic than Brown’s original version, featuring black gospel style handclapping".

Five weeks later, Brown recorded the song for DeLuxe Records. Only after Brown's record had gained traction in New Orleans did Harris decide to cover it. Harris' more energetic version may have contributed to the composition's greater success on the national R&B chart. Brown's original recording hit #13 of the Billboard R&B chart, but Harris' record became a #1 R&B hit and remained on the chart for half a year. Brown's single would re-enter the chart in 1949, peaking at #11.

Harris had a reputation for carousing, and sometimes forgot lyrics. His "Good Rockin'" recording session largely followed Brown's original lyrics, but by the end, he replaced the last section with a series of raucous "hoy hoy hoy!" interjections, a commonly used expression in jump blues tunes of the time, going back to 1945's "The Honeydripper" by Joe Liggins.

The song is a primer of sorts on the popular black music of the era, making lyrical reference to Sweet Lorraine, Sioux City Sue, Sweet Georgia Brown, Caldonia, Elder Brown, and Deacon Jones. All of these characters had figured prominently in previous hit songs. The song has also been credited with being the most successful record to that point to use the word "rock" not as a euphemism for sex, but as a descriptive for the musical style, a connection which would become even clearer in 1954 when a version of "Good Rockin' Tonight" became Elvis Presley's second-ever single.

While Brown missed out on the biggest hit version of his song, its success kicked off his own career, which included two #1 R&B hits. In 1949, he released "Rockin' at Midnight", a sequel to "Good Rockin' Tonight." It reached #2 on the R&B chart, where it remained for a month.

Elvis Presley version

In 1954, "Good Rockin' Tonight" was the second Sun Records release by Elvis Presley, along with "I Don't Care if the Sun Don't Shine" on the flip side. Presley and his bandmates' version is an almost word-for-word cover of Harris' version but omitted the lyrics' by-then-dated roster of names in favor of a simpler, more energetic "We're gonna rock, rock, rock!" Both sides of this second record featuring "Elvis Presley,” Scotty and Bill  "stiffed".

Similar to Wynonie Harris' 1948 version, Elvis added even greater "exuberance and drive" to the “rockabilly” song, but the 1954 version did not prove to be as successful.     

The song was used for the biopic Elvis, which starred Jonathan Rhys-Meyers as Presley; it was used for a montage sequence where he is performing at the Louisiana Hayride in 1954.

Personnel
 Elvis Presley – lead vocals, acoustic rhythm guitar
 Scotty Moore – electric lead guitar
 Bill Black – double bass

Other renditions
 Pat Boone's version rose to number 49 on the Billboard Hot 100 in February 1959.
 The song was a setlist staple during Bruce Springsteen and the E Street Band's 1978 Darkness Tour. A recording of the performance in at the Capitol Theater in Passaic, New Jersey, on September 20, 1978, is included on the official live audio recording of that concert. The song occasionally featured in subsequent Springsteen concerts, with the most recent rendition taking place at Citizens Bank Park in Philadelphia, Pennsylvania on September 2, 2012.
 Montrose covered the song on its debut Montrose. 
 When Led Zeppelin singer Robert Plant recorded an EP with some friends in 1984, calling the band the Honeydrippers, he focused on a "roots of rock" sound. This featured the renamed "Rockin' at Midnight" as its first single, with a strong boogie woogie feel. It reached number 25 on the Billboard Hot 100.

References

External links
 Roy Brown version
 Elvis Presley version

1947 songs
1948 singles
1954 singles
Elvis Presley songs
Song recordings produced by Sam Phillips
Rockabilly songs
American songs
Atlantic Records singles
Sun Records singles
Songs written by Roy Brown (blues musician)